Thème et variations (Theme and Variations) is a 1932 composition by Olivier Messiaen for violin and piano. It is considered as equally characteristic and immediately accessible as his Quatuor pour la fin du temps. The work was originally written as a wedding present for the composer's first wife, the violinist Claire Delbos, whom he married on 22 June 1932. The young couple gave the first performance on 22 November the same year.

The work is divided into six brief sections:
 Thème – Modéré
 Variation Number 1 – Modéré
 Variation Number 2 – Un peu moins Modére
 Variation Number 3 – Modéré, avec éclat
 Variation Number 4 – Vif et passionné
 Variation Number 5 – Tres modéré
A typical performance lasts around ten minutes.

Sources
 Dingle, Christopher. The Life of Messiaen.

References

Compositions by Olivier Messiaen
Variations
1932 compositions
Compositions for violin